Pseudosopubia is a genus of flowering plants belonging to the family Orobanchaceae.

Its native range is Northeastern and Eastern Tropical Africa.

Species:

Pseudosopubia delamerei 
Pseudosopubia hildebrandtii 
Pseudosopubia procumbens

References

Orobanchaceae
Orobanchaceae genera